The following is a list of Western Michigan University alumni. Note some of the individuals listed may have only attended the university at one point and not graduated.

Arts and literature
 Bonnie Jo Campbell, author
 Xavier Davis, pianist
 Gwen Frostic, artist, naturalist, poet laureate of Michigan, namesake of WMU's Frostic School of Art, 1929 Bachelor of Arts
 Peter Geye, author
 James D. Griffioen, writer and photographer
 Kyoko Matsuoka, author and translator
 Richelle Mead, author
 Hideaki Miyamura, potter
 Melinda Moustakis, author 
 Howard Norman, novelist
 Arleta Richardson, author
 Carey Salerno, poet
 Diane Seuss, poet
 Terry Wooten, poet

Business
 Robert Bobb, Emergency Financial Manager for the Detroit Public Schools
 Jeanne Dietsch, co-founder of MobileRobots Inc
 Alec Gores, billionaire president of the Gores Group with an estimated net worth of $1.3 billion
 Gerrard Wendell Haworth, businessman, founder of Haworth, Inc.
 Richard Haworth, businessman, chairman of Haworth, Inc., WMU trustee
 Timothy E. Hoeksema (1972), founder of Midwest Airlines
 Homer Hartman Stryker, founder of Stryker Corporation, 1916 Certificate of Teaching

Education
 Terry Bergeson, State of Washington Superintendent of Public Schools
 Robert H. Bruininks, President of University of Minnesota
 Dr. James Bultman, President of Hope College
 John A. Fallon, President, Eastern Michigan University; President, SUNY Potsdam; President, William Penn University
 Frank Douglas Garrett, All-America basketball, academic dean, Oakland University
 M. Peter McPherson, President of the National Association of State Universities and Land-Grant Colleges, member of the Dow Jones board of directors, President-Emeritus of Michigan State University
 John J. Pruis, President of Ball State University
 Merze Tate, first African American graduate of WMU; first African American woman to attend Oxford; Harvard PhD

Entertainment
 Tim Allen, actor and comedian
 Bruce Campbell, actor
 Terry Crews, actor
 Brooke Elliott, star of Lifetime Television Network show Drop Dead Diva
 Nicole Forester, actress
 Mary Jackson, actress
 Page Kennedy, actor
 Don Lane, American-born Australian entertainer
 Loretta Mae Moore Long, Susan Robinson on Sesame Street, 1960 Bachelor of Arts
 Stephen Lynch, Tony Award-nominated actor, musician, stand-up comedian
 Marin Mazzie, Tony Award winning actress
 Jeff Osterhage, film and television actor
 John Saunders, ABC Sports television personality
 Paigion, born Kimberly Walker, actress, radio and television personality
 David Wayne, film, television and Tony Award-winning stage actor
 Lauren Zakrin, Broadway actress
.

Journalism
 Roz Abrams, New York City TV news presenter, CNN reporter
 Ed Gordon, television talk show host on BET and MSNBC, correspondent for NBC News and CBS News, and radio host on NPR
 LZ Granderson, columnist for ESPN and CNN

Law

 Dennis W. Archer, Mayor of Detroit, Michigan Supreme Court Justice, President of the American Bar Association, WMU trustee, 1965 Bachelor of Science 
 John J. Bursch, former Michigan Solicitor General
 Gershwin A. Drain, Judge of the United States District Court for the Eastern District of Michigan 
Michael Cohen, Former lawyer of Donald Trump
 Karla Gray, Chief Justice of the Montana Supreme Court
 Richard Allen Griffin, Judge of the United States Court of Appeals for the Sixth Circuit
 Wallace Kent, Judge of the United States Court of Appeals for the Sixth Circuit
 John E. Turner, former Washington State Court of Appeals Judge, Division 2

Music

 Frankie Ballard, country music artist
 Scott Boerma, Director of Bands at WMU and former Director of the Michigan Marching Band
 Matt Giraud, American Idol top 5 finalist
 Josh Gracin, country music artist and American Idol finalist
 Michael Gungor, lead singer of the musical collective Gungor
 Wayne Static, lead singer and guitarist of industrial metal band Static-X
 Luther Vandross, rhythm and blues/urban contemporary singer, songwriter, and record producer
 Sango, DJ & Electronic Musician, 2015 Bachelor of Arts in Graphic Design

Politics, diplomacy and military
 Gardner Ackley, Chairman of the Council of Economic Advisers under Lyndon Johnson, Economics Department Chair at the University of Michigan 
 Jase Bolger, State Representative, Speaker of the Michigan House of Representatives
 Scott Boman, Michigan politician
 Jeanne Dietsch, New Hampshire state senator
 Gerald Jernigan, mayor of Ann Arbor, Michigan
 Robert B. Jones, Mayor of Kalamazoo and Michigan State Representative 
 Carolyn Cheeks Kilpatrick, U.S. Representative 
 Charles S. May, 16th Lieutenant Governor of Michigan
 Jack B. Olson, Lieutenant Governor of Wisconsin 
 Kitty Piercy, Mayor of Eugene, Oregon 
 Mark Schauer, U.S. Representative, State Senator, Minority Leader of the Michigan Senate 
 Dylan Schmorrow, Commander, U.S. Navy and Aerospace Experimental Psychologist 
 Mark D. Siljander, U.S. Representative 
 Rashida Tlaib, U.S. Representative and former Michigan state representative;
 Kristy Pagan, Democratic politician from Michigan who represents the 21st District in the Michigan House of Representatives

Athletics

 Keegan Akin, MLB pitcher for the Baltimore Orioles
 Richard Ash, NFL player for Dallas Cowboys
 Jason Babin, NFL player for Arizona Cardinals
 Freddie Bishop III, CFL player for Calgary Stampeders
 Jim Bouton, MLB baseball player, World Series pitcher for New York Yankees, actor, author of Ball Four 
 Don Boven, NBA player 
 Daniel Braverman (born 1993), NFL football player
 Judi Brown, Olympic silver medalist 
 Matt Cappotelli, professional wrestler
 Orlando Colon, aka Epico, WWE wrestler, played baseball for Western Michigan
 Scott Colton, aka Colt Cabana, professional wrestler and podcaster
 Kevin Connauton, NHL player for Dallas Stars
 Terry Crews, NFL all-conference MAC player and actor 
 Corey Davis, NFL wide receiver for the New York Jets, highest drafted NFL player in WMU history (5th overall)
 Danny DeKeyser, defenseman for Detroit Red Wings 
 Louis Delmas, All-American free safety NFL player 
 Bill Doba, head football coach at Washington State University (2003–2007) 
 Dave Dombrowski, President of Baseball Operations of Boston Red Sox, former GM of Detroit Tigers
 Shawn Faulkner, football player
 Brad Fischer, bullpen coach for Oakland Athletics 
 Paul Griffin, NBA player 
 Ben Handlogten, NBA player 
 John Harbaugh, NFL head coach for Baltimore Ravens (Master's degree from WMU) 
 Glenn Healy, NHL goalie 
 Greg Jennings, former NFL wide receiver 
 Keith Jones, hockey analyst on NBC Sports and NHL player 
 Ernie Koob, MLB pitcher, threw no-hitter for 1917 St. Louis Browns
 John Kusku, Team USA goalball player, Paralympic silver medalist 
 Bill Lajoie, general manager of Detroit Tigers, 1984–90; special advisor for three other teams 
 Rich Maloney, head coach for University of Michigan baseball team 
 Charlie Maxwell, Major League Baseball player 
 Jamal Mayers, NHL player for Chicago Blackhawks 
 Jeff Mayweather, trainer and former professional boxer
 Jay McDonagh, football player
 Ira James Murchison, Olympic gold medalist, NCAA national champion 
 Lenda Murray, bodybuilder, 8-time Ms. Olympia
 Tom Nütten, retired NFL player for St. Louis Rams 
 John Offerdahl, 5-time Pro Bowl NFL player
 Walter Owens, Negro league baseball pitcher, basketball and track and field player for Michigan, baseball and basketball coach at Detroit's Northwestern High School 
 William Perigo, Western Michigan basketball player and head coach
 William Porter, Olympic gold medalist 
 John Potter, professional football kicker 
 Mike Prindle, NFL placekicker 
 Frank Quilici, infielder (1965, 1967–70) and manager (1972–75) for the Minnesota Twins 
 Joe Reitz, NFL offensive lineman, WMU basketball player
 Mark Ricks, football player
 Sean Riley (born 1974), football player
 Adam Rosales, MLB third baseman for Oakland Athletics 
 Walker Russell, NBA player 
 Tony Scheffler, NFL tight end for Detroit Lions 
 Neil Smith, owner of Greenville Road Warriors of ECHL, general manager of NHL's New York Rangers and New York Islanders 
Paul Szczechura, NHL player for Tampa Bay Lightning
 Wayne Terwilliger, Chicago Cubs second baseman, MLB coach, author 
 Roger Theder, head football coach, University of California, Berkeley (1978–1981)
Ray Thomas, MLB player
 Elliot Uzelac, head football coach, Western Michigan University (1975–1981) and U.S. Naval Academy (1987–1989) 
 John Vander Wal, professional baseball player 
 Jordan White, professional football player

Fictional
 Tim Taylor, Home Improvement
 Jill Taylor, Home Improvement

References

External links
Distinguished Alumni Award Recipients

Western Michigan University alumni